Military Secretary is a post found in the military of several countries:
Military Secretary (India)
Military Secretary of Israel, called Military Secretary to the Prime Minister
Military Secretary (Pakistan)
Military Secretary (Sri Lanka)
Military Secretary (United Kingdom) 
Military Secretary to the Commandant of the Marine Corps, United States

See also
Bureau of Military Affairs, a military bureau in several imperial Chinese and Inner Asian dynasties, sometimes translated as Military Secretariat

Military administrators